Cunningham is an unincorporated community in Carlisle County, Kentucky, United States.

It is the home to the Cunningham Strawberry Festival.

Demographics

References

External links
Strawberry Festival

Unincorporated communities in Carlisle County, Kentucky
Unincorporated communities in Kentucky